Lormanje is a settlement in the Municipality of Lenart in northeastern Slovenia. The area is part of the traditional region of Styria. It is now included in the Drava Statistical Region.

Traces of Roman period buildings and a burial ground with burial mounds have been identified near the settlement.

References

External links
Lormanje on Geopedia

Populated places in the Municipality of Lenart